Women on Web (WoW) is a Canadian non-profit organization that aims to increase access to safe abortion known for its online abortion service accessible in multiple countries. The organization was founded by Dr. Rebecca Gomperts, a Dutch physician, in 2005.

The Women on Web helpdesk provides information and support in 16 languages, including Arabic, English, French, German, Japanese, Korean, Hungarian, Indonesian, Italian, Persian, Polish, Portuguese, Russian, Spanish, Thai, and Turkish. Their medical team provides online medical consultations and the delivery of pills for a medication abortion.

Self-managed medical abortion is done with mifepristone and misoprostol at home before the 12th week of pregnancy.<ref  Mifepristone and misoprostol terminate the pregnancy by inducing an abortion that resembles a miscarriage with a 97% efficacy rate during the first 60 days of pregnancy. A 2008 study published in the British Journal of Obstetrics and Gynaecology found that women are capable of self‐administering mifepristone and misoprostol at home without a doctor physically visiting them, provided proper information and instructions are given.

Since February 2022 Women on Web has provided abortion pills in advance of unwanted pregnancies: "With the help of this new service, women can request abortion pills in advance and take them as soon as they discover they are pregnant. Women on Web's medical team will prescribe the abortion pills to people who are not yet pregnant but who anticipate that they may need them in the future".

Research 
Several scientific studies on the outcome of abortions and the experiences of women who have used the Women on Web service have proven that abortion via telemedicine is safe, highly effective and acceptable to women. This has been confirmed by the World Health Organization which has recognized that abortions done with the help of Women on Web are considered safe.

Women on Web has also researched data from women in countries where abortion is not legally restricted to highlight the barriers in access to safe abortion services.  Research from countries such as the UK, the Netherlands, Hungary and the USA has shown that women face obstacles to access abortion services when these services are only available in clinics or hospitals.

Censorship 

Women on Web’s websites are censored in several countries, but there are ways to access their online consultation for abortions even if the main website is unavailable. Women on Web maintains several local language websites to circumvent online censorship and expand access to their service.

See also
Women on Waves
Aid Access

References

WHO Publication List: Unsafe Abortion on Internet Archive

External links
Official Women on Web website

Feminist websites
Abortion-rights organisations in the Netherlands
Women's websites